Qaleh-ye Abd ol Reza (also Romanized as Qal‘eh-ye ‘Abd ol Reẕā, Qal‘eh-ye ‘Abd or Reẕā, Ghal’eh Abdolreza, Qal‘eh ‘Abd or Rezā, Qal‘eh ‘Abdur Riza, Qal‘eh-ye ‘Abdo Reẕā, Qal‘eh-ye ‘Abd or Rezā, and Qal’eh-ye Abd Rezā) is a village in Borborud-e Sharqi Rural District, in the Central District of Aligudarz County, Lorestan Province, Iran. At the 2006 census, its population was 90, in 18 families.

References 

Towns and villages in Aligudarz County